The 1986–87 Winnipeg Jets season was the 15th season of the Winnipeg Jets, their eighth in the National Hockey League. The Jets placed third in the Smythe Division to qualify for the playoffs. The Jets defeated the Calgary Flames in the first round but lost the Division Final to the Edmonton Oilers. This was the last playoff series win for the original Jets before they moved to Phoenix, Arizona.

Offseason
After a poor 1985–86 season, in which the Jets fired head coach Barry Long and replaced him on an interim basis with general manager John Ferguson, the team hired Dan Maloney to become the new head coach on June 20, 1986.  Maloney had previously been the head coach of the Toronto Maple Leafs from 1984 to 1986, posting a 45-100-15 record with the Leafs during that span.

On June 21, 1986, the Jets selected forward Pat Elynuik with their first round, eighth overall draft pick at the 1986 NHL Entry Draft.  Elynuik spent the 1985-86 season with the Prince Albert Raiders, scoring 53 goals and 106 points in 68 games.  In the second round, Winnipeg selected defenseman Teppo Numminen from Tappara Tampere of the SM-liiga.

On August 15, 1986, the Jets made a trade with the Montreal Canadiens, acquiring goaltender Steve Penney and Jan Ingman for goaltender Brian Hayward.  Penney had a 6-8-2 record with a 4.36 GAA with Montreal during the 1985-86 season as the back-up to Patrick Roy.

Regular season

Final standings

Schedule and results

Playoffs
The Jets won the Division Semi-Finals (4-2) versus Calgary Flames to advance to the Division Finals, which they lost 4-0 to the eventual Stanley Cup champion Edmonton Oilers.

Player statistics

Regular season
Scoring

Goaltending

Playoffs
Scoring

Goaltending

Awards and records

Transactions

Trades

Draft picks
The Jets selected the following players at the 1986 NHL Entry Draft, which was held at the Toronto Convention Centre in Toronto, Ontario on June 15, 1985.

NHL Entry Draft

Farm teams

See also
 1986–87 NHL season

References

External links

Winnipeg Jets season, 1986-87
Winnipeg Jets (1972–1996) seasons
Winn